Who's Stopping Us is a 2021 Spanish film directed by Jonás Trueba. Featuring a running time over three and a half hours long, the film is a generational portrait of youth blending documentary and fiction pieces.

Plot 
The film tracks a group high schoolers in Madrid, following them from mid-teens to their early 20s.

Cast

Production 
A Los Ilusos Films production, Who's Stopping Us was shot from 2016 to 2021.

Release 
The film had its world premiere at the 69th San Sebastián International Film Festival (SSIFF), screened on 22 September 2021 (6th day) as pàrt of the festival's official competition. Distributed by Atalante Cinema, the film was theatrically released in Spain on 22 October 2021.

Reception 
Pablo Vázquez of Fotogramas scored 5 out of 5 stars, extolling the absence of any sort of imposture, while noting that its extended runtime perhaps will dissuade cowards, assessing the film to be "a cum laude thesis with which its director embraces his maturity as a filmmaker".

Carmen L. Lobo of La Razón gave it 4 out of 5 stars, considering "its splendid, immersive direction, and the optimism and nostalgia enveloping the film" to be the best thing about Who's Stopping Us.

Quim Casas of El Periódico de Catalunya rated the film with 4 out of 5 stars, considering that the vast amount of material "has taken an exciting form, in different blocks perfectly articulated with each other."

Jonathan Romney of ScreenDaily wrote that the film is "not as revelatory as it intends, this is an only intermittently fascinating watch, an over-extended experiment that doesn't quite hold its own against 21st-century cinema's more incisive portraits of youth".

Who's Stopping Us closed Cahiers du Cinémas top 10 films of 2022 list.

Accolades 

|-
| align = "center" rowspan = "3" | 2021 || rowspan = "3" | 69th San Sebastián International Film Festival || Silver Shell for Best Supporting Performance || The whole cast ||  || rowspan = "3" | 
|-
| colspan = "2" | Feroz Zinemaldia Award || 
|-
| colspan = "2" | FIPRESCI Award || 
|-
| align = "center" rowspan = "4" | 2022 || 9th Feroz Awards || colspan = "2" | Arrebato Award (Non-Fiction Film) ||  || 
|-
| 77th CEC Medals || colspan = "2" | Best Documentary Film ||  || 
|-
| 36th Goya Awards || colspan = "2" | Best Documentary Film ||  || 
|-
| 9th Platino Awards || colspan = "2" | Best Documentary Film ||  || 
|}

See also 
 List of Spanish films of 2021

References 

2020s Spanish-language films
Spanish documentary films
2021 documentary films
2020s Spanish films